Notre Dame-Siena College of Polomolok is a private, Catholic, non-stock basic and higher education institution run by the Congregation of the Dominican Sisters of St. Catherine of Siena in Polomolok, South Cotabato, Philippines. It was founded by the (Siena Sisters) in 1957 and was named Notre Dame of Polomolok (NDP) but changed its name to Notre Dame-Siena College of Polomolok at the opening of its college department in 2004. Notre Dame-Siena College of Polomolok is a member of the Notre Dame Educational Association, a group of Notre Dame Schools in the Philippines under the patronage of the Blessed Virgin Mary. The college offers a complete basic education and selected college education programs as follows:
 Bachelor of Science in Computer Science (BSCS)
 Bachelor of Science in Information Technology (BSIT)
 Bachelor of Elementary Education (BEED) major in Content Areas
 Bachelor of Secondary Education (BSED)
 Bachelor of Science in Business Administration (BSBA) major in Business Management
 Bachelor of Science in Entrepreneurship (BSE)
 Bachelor in Technical and Vocational Education (BTVE)

ND-SCP is administered by the Dominican Sisters of St. Catherine of Siena.

Presidents
 2004-2005  ----- Sr. Lina G. Tuyac, OP, Ph.D.
 2005-2008  ----- Sr. Anna Marie Gatmaytan, O.P., Ph.D.
 2008-2011  ----- Sr. Mercedes R. Lalisan, O.P., Ph.D.
 2011-2014  ----- Sr. Lina G. Tuyac, O.P., Ph.D.
 2014-2019  ----- Sr. Gina M. Galang, O.P., Ph.D.
 2019–present - Sr. Pinlyn B. Dahili, OP., Ph.D.

See also
Siena College of Quezon City
Siena College of Taytay, Rizal

External links
ND-SCP web site

High schools in the Philippines
Universities and colleges in South Cotabato
Notre Dame Educational Association